Lepidopleurus finlayi is a species of chiton in the family Leptochitonidae.

References
 Powell A. W. B., New Zealand Mollusca, William Collins Publishers Ltd, Auckland, New Zealand 1979 

Leptochitonidae
Chitons of New Zealand
Molluscs described in 1929